The "Dean Dozen" in American politics, was the collective term for six groups of 12 candidates endorsed by Democracy for America, the political action committee led by former Vermont governor and presidential candidate Howard Dean, in the 2004 elections.

Those chosen to be in the Dean Dozens were Democrats. Governor Dean called the Dean Dozen "the progressive movement’s best chance at taking back Congress." Candidates Selected received significant promotion by progressive groups through emails, fundraisers, and speeches. Democracy for America also fundraisers for the candidates directly, using their membership of over a million citizens to seek contributions for candidates directly

They came from across the U.S. and ran for widely varying positions, from county sheriff to U.S. Senator. No incumbents were chosen, and members of Dean Dozens also tended to target key districts.

Candidates in bold won.

In the 2012 elections Governor Dean selected a new Dean Dozen to receive the endorsement of DFA.

List of Dean Dozens

First
Mary Ann Andreas: 80th State Assembly District, California
Ken Campbell: Oconee County Representative, South Carolina State House 
Maria Chappelle-Nadal: 72nd State House District, Missouri State House
Scott Clark, Mark Manoil and Nina Trasoff: Arizona Corporation Commission
Kim Hynes: Connecticut State Representative 
Richard Morrison: U.S. Representative from Texas
Barack Obama: State Senator and U.S. Senate Candidate from Illinois
Rob MacKenna: Supervisor of Elections in Hillsborough County, Florida
Monica Palacios-Boyce: Massachusetts State Representative
Lori Saldaña: California State Assembly
Jeff Smith: State Senator from Missouri
Donna Red Wing: District 25, Colorado State House

Second
Kalyn Free: United States Representative from Oklahoma (Lost in primary)
Tom Potter: Mayor of Portland, Oregon
Alisha Thomas Morgan: Georgia General Assembly
Samara "Sam" Barend: U.S. Representative from New York
Peter Corroon: mayor of Salt Lake County, Utah
Vicki Walker: Missouri State House
David Van Os: Texas Supreme Court
Patrick McCormick: County Council for DeKalb County, Illinois
Jonathan Bing New York State Assembly
Christine Cegelis: U.S. Representative from Illinois
Don McDaniel: Georgia General Assembly
Nelson Thompson: Board of Chosen Freeholders for Cumberland County, New Jersey

Third
Jim Stork: United States Congress from Florida
Tami Green: Washington State House of Representatives
Susan Clary: Soil and Water Conservation District Supervisor of Orange County, Fl 
Eddgra Fallin: School Board in Huntsville, Al. S
Missy Taylor: Kansas House of Representatives. 
Judge William O'Neill: Supreme Court of Ohio. 
Patti Fritz: Minnesota State House District 26B. 
Scott Kawasaki: Alaska State House
Lois Herr: United States Congress from Pennsylvania. 
James Whitaker: Michigan State House. 
Edward Ableser: Arizona House of Representatives.

2012 Dean Dozen
José M. Hernández (CA-10)
Kathy Boockvar (PA-8)
Carol Shea-Porter (NH-1)
Joe Miklosi (CO-6)
Martin Heinrich (NM-Sen)
Shelli Yoder (IN-9)
Annie Kuster (NH-02)
Raul Ruiz (CA-36)
Manan Trivedi (PA-06)
Elizabeth Warren (MA-Sen)
Mazie Hirono (HI-Sen)
Tammy Baldwin (WI-Sen)

Others
Other endorsed candidates include:
Paul Babbitt, candidate for U.S. representative from Arizona
Jerry McNerney and Jim Brandt, candidates for U.S. representative from California
Stan Matsunaka, candidate for U.S. representative from Colorado
Jon Jennings and Melina Fox, candidates for U.S. representative from Indiana
Adam Smith, candidate for U.S. representative from Kentucky
Nancy Farmer, candidate for U.S. senator from Missouri
Brian Schweitzer, candidate for governor of Montana
John Lynch, candidate for governor of New Hampshire
Amy Vasquez, Anne Wolfe, Herb Conaway, and Steve Brozak, candidates for U.S. representative from New Jersey
Richard Romero, candidate for U.S. representative from New Mexico
Patsy Keever, candidate for U.S. representative from North Carolina
Greg Harris and Jeff Seemann, candidates for U.S. representative from Ohio
Joe Hoeffel, candidate for U.S. senator from Pennsylvania
Peter Clavelle, candidate for governor of Vermont
Al Weed and James Socas, candidates for U.S. representative from Virginia

References

Political terminology of the United States
Howard Dean